Robert Müller (25 June 1980 – 21 May 2009) was a German professional ice hockey goaltender. He played in the Deutsche Eishockey Liga from 1998 to 2009.

Career 
Müller made his professional debut with EHC Klostersee of the 2nd Bundesliga in the 1997-98 season, before playing in the Deutsche Eishockey Liga (DEL) from 1998 to 2009. He won the league championship with the Krefeld Pinguine in 2002–03, repeating the feat with the Adler Mannheim in 2006–07.

The Washington Capitals of the National Hockey League (NHL) selected Müller as their ninth-round pick in the 2001 NHL Entry Draft, 275th overall, but he never played for the team.

Illness and death 
In November 2006, Müller was diagnosed with a malignant brain tumor, known as glioblastoma.  Part of the tumor was surgically removed, followed by chemotherapy and radiation treatment later in the year. It appeared impossible for Müller to play professional ice hockey any longer, but he recovered and made his comeback on 3 February 2007 at the DEL All-Star Game 2007.

In 2008, Müller was named again to the national team at the Skoda Cup in Switzerland.  In August of that same year, while playing for the Kölner Haie, the tumor continued to grow, requiring another operation. After that he absolved his physician, Wolfgang Wick, from patient/physician confidentiality. Wick told the media that Müller was terminally ill and already exceeded the anticipated average life, as only 3% of the people having the same cancer live over five years.

On 18 December 2008 Müller's doctor declared him no longer fit to play, as his condition grew worse. He died of brain cancer on 21 May 2009; he is survived by his two children.

After Müller's death it was announced that the Kölner Haie, Adler Mannheim, and EHC Klostersee would all retire his number 80. EHC Red Bull München also retired his number 80, even though Müller had never played for München. The DEL also announced that starting with the 2009/10 season, the number 80 would never be used in the league again.

In 2017 Müller's silhouette was used for the logo of the 2017 IIHF World Championship.

Career statistics

References

External links

1980 births
2009 deaths
Adler Mannheim players
Deaths from cancer in Germany
Deaths from brain tumor
EHC Basel players
Füchse Duisburg players
German expatriate sportspeople in Switzerland
German ice hockey goaltenders
Ice hockey players at the 2002 Winter Olympics
Ice hockey players at the 2006 Winter Olympics
EHC Klostersee players
Kölner Haie players
Krefeld Pinguine players
Neurological disease deaths in Germany
Olympic ice hockey players of Germany
People from Rosenheim
Sportspeople from Upper Bavaria
Starbulls Rosenheim players
Washington Capitals draft picks